Agnichakra is a Hindi-language action drama film directed by Amit Suryavanshi and produced by Piyush Kumar. This film was released on 26 February 1997 under the banner  of Jyoti Arts Productions. This is the debut film of actress Rakhi Sawant.

Plot
Tasked with catching the terrorist Jumbo, police inspector Suryaveer goes to Jumbo's forest hideout along with Satpal, another police officer. Jumbo kills Suryaveer and severely inures Satpal. Now Amar, Suryaveer's brother, must to track down the terrorists and revenge his older brother's death.

Cast
 Naseeruddin Shah as Police Inspector Satpal
 Govinda as Amar
 Dimple Kapadia as Rani
 Anupam Kher as Dhanraj
 Raj Kiran as  Police Inspector Suryaveer
 Pramod Moutho as Jumbo
Satish Shah as Sada Ranglani
Raju Srivastav as Joseph

Soundtrack
All songs were composed by Bappi Lahiri and penned by Amit Khanna.

"Dil Dene Se Pehle Dobara Sochna" - Kumar Sanu, Alka Yagnik
"Arzi Mere Dil Ki" - Alka Yagnik, Bappi Lahiri
"Paisa Hi Paisa" - Sudesh Bhosle, Asha Bhosle
"Aila Rani Ka Dil Kho Gaya" - Kavita Krishnamurthy, Amit Kumar
"Gup Chup Gup Chup" - Sudesh Bhosle, Parvati Khan
"Mera Naam Action" - Amit Kumar
"Tere Paas Tota Hain" - Vinod Rathod, Poornima

Reception
Komal Nahta called it "a poor fare".

References

External links
 

1997 films
1990s Hindi-language films
Indian action drama films
1997 drama films